Bizzell is a surname. Notable people with the surname include:

Clint Bizzell (born 1976), Australian rules footballer
Graham Bizzell (1941–2014), Australian cricketer
Harry (Buzz) Lee Bizzell III (born 1958), American Environmental Designer
Jim Bob Bizzell (born 1985), American Paralympic athlete
Patricia Bizzell PhD, Professor of English and Chairperson of the English Department at College of the Holy Cross, USA
William Bizzell (1876–1944), fifth president of the University of Oklahoma and president of Agricultural and Mechanical College of Texas

See also
Bizzell Memorial Library, located at the University of Oklahoma in Norman, Oklahoma